The 1999 Maldon District Council election took place on 6 May 1999 to elect members of Maldon District Council in England. This was on the same day as other local elections.

Election result

|}

References

1999 English local elections
May 1999 events in the United Kingdom
1999
1990s in Essex